The men's 880 yards event at the 1930 British Empire Games was held on 17 and 21 August at the Civic Stadium in Hamilton, Canada.

Medalists

Results

Heats
Qualification: First 4 in each heat (Q) qualify directly for the final.

Final

References

Athletics at the 1930 British Empire Games
1930